Kasper Rørsted (born 24 February 1962) is a Danish business executive who has been the CEO of German sportwear firm Adidas since 2016. On 22 August 2022, it was announced that he would hand over his role as CEO during the course of 2023.

Early life and education
During high school, Rørsted played handball for Denmark's national youth team. He went on to study at Copenhagen Business School with further Executive Education at Harvard Business School.

Career

Early career
In his early career, Rørsted worked with Oracle, Digital Equipment Corporation, and Compaq. From 2001 to 2002, he was managing director of Compaq Enterprise Business Group in EMEA. He moved to the managing director position at HP EMEA from 2002 to 2004. In 2005 he became director at Henkel, become vice chairman in 2007 and CEO in 2008. Under his stewardship, the group's market capitalization quadrupled to more than €36 billion.

In January 2016, it was announced that Kasper would leave the company to become CEO of Adidas, replacing Herbert Hainer. In 2020, the Adidas supervisory board extended his contract until 2026. In 2022, however, Rørsted and the company's supervisory board had mutually agreed that he would hand over his position during the course of 2023.

Other activities
Rørsted has been a member of several corporate boards and non-profit organizations, including Siemens AG, Nestlé, and European Round Table of Industrialists (ERT).

Personal life
Rørsted is married with four children. The family resides in Munich.

References

External links 
 "Blue book: Kasper Rørsted (Danish)" Århus Stiftstidende. Retrieved Jan 18, 2016

Living people
1962 births
People from Aarhus
Danish chief executives
Harvard Business School alumni
Adidas people
Henkel